Diestrammena griffinii is a species of camel crickets in the tribe Aemodogryllini and subgenus Diestrammena.  It has been recorded from Vietnam: the type locality was near Tuyen Quan, NW of Hanoi.

References 

Rhaphidophoridae
Orthoptera of Indo-China